The Molson family of Montreal, Quebec, Canada,  was founded by John Molson, who immigrated to Canada in 1782 from his home in Lincolnshire, England. They are considered to be one of Canada's most prominent business families with a combined net worth of C$1.75 billion.

History
John Molson's success saw him and his offspring build Canada's largest brewery (Molson Brewery), finance its first steamboat and build the first railroad. His sons established Molson's Bank, which printed its own currency, and in the city of Montreal, which was overwhelmingly Catholic, they financed the construction of a Protestant church.

The three Molson family mausoleums, built by Irish-born architect George Browne, are among  Mount Royal Cemetery's most prestigious funerary monuments.

Hartland Molson, a businessman and statesman, expanded the family's brewing operations nationwide, co-purchased the Canadian Arena, which included the Montreal Forum and the Montreal Canadiens ice hockey club (1957–1964), and co-sponsored Hockey Night in Canada with his brother, Thomas Henry Pentland Molson. He also served as a Governor of McGill University, and he was a senator for 38 years.

Philanthropy
As major contributors to the economy, Hartland Molson and his brother Thomas Henry Pentland Molson gave back by creating the Molson Foundation in 1958, which awarded annual grants for outstanding achievement in the arts by Canadian citizens (renamed the Molson Family Foundation in 1981). The Thomas Henry Pentland Molson Prize for the Arts is awarded by The Canada Council for the Arts annually to distinguished individuals in the arts and the social sciences and humanities, and is intended to encourage continuing contribution to the cultural and intellectual heritage of Canada. The Thomas Henry Pentland Prize for general excellence is awarded annually at Selwyn House School, which he attended in 1911. The Thomas Henry Pentland Molson Family Scholarship is awarded annually by the Lester B. Pearson United World College of the Pacific.

William, Thomas and John Molson Jr. provided McGill University's first endowed chair, the Molson Chair in English Language and Literature. In addition, in 1860, William Molson donated Molson Hall, the west wing of the university's Arts Building. Later generations of the Molson family provided funds to expand the university's medical buildings, as well as a gift of land for the Redpath Library.

In 2005, the Molson Family Foundation donated the Hartland Molson Hall at Bishop's College School and the building is named for Senator Hartland Molson, where many Molson family members attended school.

The Molson Family Foundation, together with several members of the family, contributed the major part of the funds required for the construction of the Molson Fine Arts Building at Bishop's University. The building bears witness to the interest of members of the Molson family in the welfare of Bishop's University, over a period of more than 60 years: 
Walter Molson, Trustee 1928–1951,
John H. Molson, President of Corporation 1947–1966,
J. David Molson, Trustee 1965–1968,
William M. Molson, Trustee 1968–1976,
Eric H. Molson, Trustee 1976–1984.

Notable members of the Molson family

 John Molson (1763–1836)
John Molson Jr. (1787–1860)
Thomas Molson (1791–1863)
Martha Molson (1824–1900)
John Henry Robinson Molson (1826–1897)
Mary Anne Molson (1826–1922)
Harriet Molson (1830–1913)
Markland Molson
Frances Molson (1835–1841)
John Thomas Molson (1837–1910)
Lillias Savage Molson (1866–1919)
Herbert Molson (1875–1938)
Thomas Henry Pentland Molson (1901–1978)
Eric Molson (b. 1937)
Andrew Molson (b. 1967)
Justin Molson (b. 1969)
Geoff Molson (b. 1971), CEO and President of the Montreal Canadiens and former VP with Molsons
Mary Dorothy Molson MacDougall (1904–1992)
Naomi Elizabeth Molson Mather (1906–1992)
Hartland Molson (1907–2002)
Kenneth Molson (1877–1932)
Mabel Molson (1879–1973)
Percival Molson (1880–1917)
Walter Molson (1883–1953)
William Molson (1793–1875)
William Markland Molson (1833–1913) 
Harry Markland Molson (1856–1912)
Samuel Elsdale Molson
John Elsdale Molson (1863–1925)
Arthur Hugh Molson, Baron Molson (1903–1991)
William Alexander Molson 
William Hobart Molson (1888–1951), only son of Dr. William Alexander Molson
John Henry Molson
J. David Molson (1928–2017), son of John Henry Molson

References

 Molson family gifts at McGill University website

 
Canadian business families
Canadian brewers
Business families
National Hockey League owners